Andriy Yuriyovych Novak (born 6 December 1988) is a Ukrainian retired professional football goalkeeper and current goalkeeping coach of Mynai.

External links
 Website Karpaty Profile
 Profile on Football Squads
 
 
 
 

1988 births
Living people
Sportspeople from Szczecin
Polish emigrants to Ukraine
Ukrainian footballers
Association football goalkeepers
FC Chornohora Ivano-Frankivsk players
FC Spartak Ivano-Frankivsk players
FC Karpaty Lviv players
FC Karpaty-2 Lviv players
FC Prykarpattia Ivano-Frankivsk (2004) players
FC Enerhetyk Burshtyn players
FC Nyva Ternopil players
FC Tiraspol players
FC Oleksandriya players
Ermis Aradippou FC players
FC Chornomorets Odesa players
FC Prykarpattia Ivano-Frankivsk (1998) players
Ukrainian Premier League players
Ukrainian First League players
Ukrainian Second League players
Cypriot First Division players
Ukrainian expatriate footballers
Expatriate footballers in Moldova
Ukrainian expatriate sportspeople in Moldova
Expatriate footballers in Cyprus
Ukrainian expatriate sportspeople in Cyprus